No Ordinary Family is an American television series that aired on ABC in the United States and CTV in Canada. The one hour science fiction comedy drama was produced by ABC Studios for the 2010–2011 television season. The series ran from September 28, 2010, to April 5, 2011, on Tuesdays at 8:00pm ET/PT. The show centers on the Powells, a typical American family living in fictional Pacific Bay, California, whose members gain special powers after their plane crashes in the Amazon, Brazil.

On May 13, 2011, ABC canceled the series after one season.

Cast and characters

Main cast 
 Michael Chiklis as James "Jim" Powell, Sr. – a police sketch artist whose power is super-strength (he can lift 11,000 lbs). He is nearly invulnerable, and can leap over tall buildings (or jump a quarter-mile). When in contact with cinoxate, his powers fail. His weakness lies in finesse and agility.
 Julie Benz as Dr. Stephanie Powell (née Crane) – a scientist who works at Global Tech. She has super speed (running 10 miles in just under five seconds) and an incredibly fast metabolism that allows her to heal quickly. However, when she was attacked by Lucas Winnick, an animal-like posthuman, she was injected with the Trilsetum Coronis serum in an attempt to save her life.  This allowed her to (possibly only temporarily) run faster than the speed of light, enabling time travel. She was initially working on the research of the Trilsetum Coronis, the "crown jewel" plant of the Amazon Basin. She later found out that the plant shared the same chromosomes as the family's super powered DNA.
 Kay Panabaker as Daphne Nicole Powell – Jim and Stephanie's 16-year-old daughter. She has the power of telepathy and the ability to view the memories of others. She later discovered that she could also influence the behavior of others for a short time by means of telepathic suggestion (the term "pushing" was also used to describe this ability, possibly in reference to a similar ability possessed by the Andy McGee character in Firestarter by Stephen King). She also develops the ability to erase memories through this method.
 Jimmy Bennett as James "JJ" Powell, Jr. – Jim and Stephanie's 14-year-old son; a teenager with vast intelligence. He has the ability to speed-read and comprehend large amounts of information by just reading the page (but is initially only capable of remembering it for six hours). This ability gives him a photographic memory. He is also capable of learning a new language fluently in a matter of minutes. His powers extend to a form of "genius vision". When he experiences intense emotional stress, his powers fail. His enhanced intellect appears to extend his ability to handle extra-academic situations, enhanced fighting skill being an example. It is revealed that he is immune to Daphne's telepathic push.
 Autumn Reeser as Katie Andrews – a lab tech and Stephanie's personal assistant at Global Tech and comic book fangirl. She is aware of the Powells' superpowers. She is also dating the Watcher (under the alias of Will and later Joshua), but it is unknown to her that he had been hired by Dr. King to find out about the Powell family's abilities. Her favorite superhero(ine) is Kitty Pryde. Katie acquired telekinetic powers due to her pregnancy with Joshua's child. Katie and Joshua eventually reconnect after he returns and helps Katie deliver their baby prematurely. The baby initially appears to be stillborn, but its eyes quickly flash green and it returns to life, presumably as a result of its Trilsetum DNA.
 Romany Malco as George St. Cloud – an assistant district attorney in Pacific Bay and long-time friend of Jim's. He also knows of the Powells' superpowers. He is a comic book fanboy. He sponsors and runs the crime-fighting intelligence network ("The Lair") from his garage which he has equipped with hi-tech surveillance, tracking and computer equipment. In the season one finale, George is aboard an airplane along with 80 prisoners who are to be turned into super villains. Since George survived the crash it is presumed that he also developed super powers like the rest of passengers on the plane after crashing in the same manner as the Powells.
 Stephen Collins as Dr. Dayton King – Stephanie's boss at Global Tech and, as the series unfolds, a key figure in the Powells' super-powered universe. He is a typical Hitchcockian villain to the series (i.e. a character who clearly cannot be trusted). He is also in love with Stephanie Powell. In episode 14, through the security cameras, he finally learns of Jim and Stephanie's powers. In episode 16, it is revealed that he is The Watcher's adoptive father and has some sort of interest in JJ's powers. It is revealed he took the serum to heal himself after contracting cancer. In episode 20, JJ injects him with Stephanie's power cure, and King dies when the cancer returns at an accelerated rate.
 Josh Stewart as the Watcher – the series' super villain, later another super hero like the Powells. Originally Dr. King's evil enforcer and assassin, he goes by aliases of Will and later Joshua when interacting with the family during his investigation of them. His powers are temporary, and without regular injections from Dr. King to maintain them, he undergoes withdrawal. He has been shown to have the abilities of telekinesis, telepathic suggestion, and an immunity to Daphne's telepathy. In the episode "No Ordinary Sidekick", he is unable to hide his thoughts when Daphne accidentally uses her power to see other people's thoughts through physical contact. Consequently, Joshua demonstrates his ability to erase memory by removing Daphne's memories of everything that happened from the family's trip to Brazil, to the present. In Episode 11, he surrenders the injections that give him his powers in order to start a normal relationship with Katie. In Episode 13, it is revealed that the injections he was given were keeping him alive, but before dying he goes through severe withdrawal followed by organ failure. In Episode 14, it is revealed that through advanced level of telepathic suggestion, he can "re-wire" memories, which kept his real name, among other things, secret. In Episode 16, it was announced that Dr. King is his adoptive father who saved his life from a terminal illness by injecting him with the serum when Joshua was 6 years old. In the season finale, it is revealed that Joshua is being held in a prison by Mrs. X. JJ is thrown in the same cell as Joshua. Joshua subsequently helps JJ figure out the secret making the super powers permanent. Dr. King lets his "son" out, in secret, telling him that he will always be there for him, and that Joshua should go and be with his family. Joshua returns to Katie, and, after turning Victoria away, helps Katie deliver their child prematurely. The baby initially appears to be stillborn, but its eyes quickly flash green and it returns to life, presumably as a result of its Trilsetum DNA.

Recurring cast 
 Christina Chang as Detective Yvonne Cho – a cop who worked at the same precinct as Jim. She was murdered by Joshua (The Watcher) in Episode 2, shot with her own gun, off screen.
 Jason Antoon as Mr. Litchfield – JJ's math teacher, who initially suspected JJ of cheating due to his sharp change after he came back from his vacation. Later worked for Dr. King and then Mrs. X in attempting to harness JJ's powers for himself. Killed on Mrs. X's orders after repeatedly failing to get JJ's cooperation.
 Guillermo Díaz as Detective Frank Cordero. Took over Detective Cho's role after her murder. Was killed by dirty cops in Episode 19.
 Reggie Lee as Dr. Francis Chiles – a scientist who worked for Global Tech. He was murdered by the Watcher in Episode 10.
 Amy Acker as Amanda Grayson, co-counsel of George and DA of the Pacific Bay district. She seems to have a close relationship with George.
 Luke Kleintank as Chris Minor – a juvenile delinquent with a good heart, who falls for Daphne Powell and becomes her new boyfriend. She eventually tells him about her powers. He persuades her to use them to help them cut school and get time off from his boss. When her family pressures her to keep their secret, Daphne decides to erase Chris' memory of her powers. However, this also makes him forget their entire relationship.
 Jonna Walsh as Megan—Daphne's friend, who she wishes to confide her secret to.
 Katelyn Tarver as Natalie Poston – JJ's love interest, member of the "Smart People Club", good at playing chess. Her mother was murdered when she was four years old and she never knew who her father was, so she has moved around between foster homes for the past 12 years.
 Katrina Begin as Bailey Browning – alpha girl at Daphne's and JJ's high school. She has shown to take an interest in JJ after JJ's and Natalie's break-up.
 Rebecca Mader as Victoria Morrow – Vice President of Human Resource at Global Tech and another super villan. She pledged allegiance to Dr. King and has the ability to shape-shift. In Episode 13, she learned of Stephanie Powell's superpowers. In Episode 15, she appears to die in a brawl with Jim. However, it turns out later she is still alive, revived by Mrs. X, who sends her to find out more of Katie's pregnancy. In Episode 20, it is revealed that she is also in love with Joshua. She is also on the plane that spirals out of control and crashes in that same episode.
 Jean-Luc Bilodeau as Brett Martin – Daphne's schoolmate who is interested in modern art, Japanese language and sushi.
 Lucy Lawless as Helen Burton, a.k.a. Mrs. X – The CEO of Global Tech whom Dr. King works for and reports to. She is the real villain to the series and is intent on finding out the Powells' powers and the secret to permanence.

Guest cast 
 Tate Donovan as Mitch McCutcheon – was initially a series regular, but was subsequently dropped. The pilot for the Powell's airplane for their Brazil trip who is presumed dead.
 Chord Overstreet as Lucas Fisher – Daphne's boyfriend (in the unaired pilot, replaced by Nathan Keyes) who she discovers is cheating on her when she reads his mind.
 Bruce McGill as Allan Crane – Stephanie's father who hates Jim and later accuses him of cheating on Stephanie.
 Cybill Shepherd as Barbara Crane – Stephanie's mother
 Jackson Rathbone as Trent – a boy who witnesses his house being robbed, refuses to tell the truth to the police. Daphne discovers new elements to her powers when she touches his hand and can read his past thoughts/memories re: the break-in.
 Rachel Miner as Rebecca Jessup – formerly arrested, she used her hands to emit shock-waves to create artificial earthquakes in order to steal medicines in various pharmacies to get rid of her abilities. She was also locked up by Dr. King many times. It is not known what happened to her after she has been knocked out by Joshua (Watcher).
 Anthony Michael Hall as Roy Minor – Chris' father who gains super strength making him stronger than Jim after his son steals Stephanie's serum.
 Alex Solowitz as Theo Patton – a sociopathic serial arsonist who can set himself on fire; supposedly killed when a tank of sand fell on him while he was on fire.
 Jamie Harris as Reed Koblenz – a teleporter and robber who was shot and killed by Det. Cho in episode 1.
 Annie Wersching as Michelle Cotten – Dave's wife and secret art thief.
 Rick Schroder as Dave Cotten – a man who befriends the Powells after Jim saves his life.
 Billy Unger as Troy Cotten – Dave and Michelle's son.
 Conor Leslie as Chloe Cotten – Dave and Michelle's daughter.
 Jason Wiles as Mike Powell – Jim's brother who is up to his neck in debt and takes advantage of JJ's powers.
 Ethan Suplee as Tom Seeley – escaped from Santos County Correctional Facility the same place where Rebeccas Jessup and Theo Patton was arrested. He wanted payback on Dr. King. Can become fog with his powers.
 Tricia Helfer as Sophie Adler – a beautiful woman who can make men fall in love with her by way of her pheromones. Mrs. X asks her to seduce George and Jim; the plan works at first, but ultimately fails. She dies in a car explosion which was set up by Mrs.X.
 Robert Picardo as Mr. Lance – The vice-principal at Daphne and JJ's school.
 Eric Balfour as Lucas Winnick – a man with the powers of various animals who Mrs. X assigns to kill people with super powers but he later discovers that the Powells have powers and they become his next target.
 Michael Maize as Ben – a man with the power to use electricity to stop or kill people. He dies in episode 20 when his abilities backfire on him.
 Shay Carl as security guard

Development and casting 
On January 25, 2010, ABC green-lit production of the pilot, which was written by Greg Berlanti and Jon Harmon Feldman. David Semel directed the pilot. Berlanti and Feldman are executive producers, along with Morgan Wandell.

In early February 2010, Michael Chiklis became the first actor to join the series, playing family patriarch Jim Powell. Autumn Reeser was the next actor cast, to play a colleague of Jim's wife. Romany Malco portrays Jim's best friend and college roommate.

March 2010 casting included Julie Benz as Jim's wife and family matriarch Stephanie Powell and Christina Chang as a police officer who works with Jim. Tate Donovan is the mysterious pilot of the plane that crashes. Rounding out the cast are Kay Panabaker and Jimmy Bennett, who portray the Powell children Daphne and JJ. Shay Carl- security guard

On May 12, 2010, Entertainment Weekly reported that ABC had picked up the series for the 2010–11 television season.  A few days later, Chuck writer and executive producer Allison Adler (credited as Ali Adler) announced that she would be joining the show's writing team. At the end of May, Smallville writers Darren Swimmer and Todd Slavkin joined the writing team.

On June 3, 2010, Donovan and Chang left the show due to the completion of their story lines. Producers said there was a potential for Donovan to come back as guest stars at a later date. Stephen Collins, who initially had a small role in the series, was promoted to a series regular in mid-June.  Entertainment Weekly'''s Michael Ausiello reports that Josh Stewart, late of Criminal Minds, has joined the cast as the Watcher.

On October 25, 2010 ABC gave the series a full-season order.  This order was cut back to 20 episodes on February 26, 2011.

At the beginning of March 2011, the two lead stars Michael Chiklis and Julie Benz signed for Fall 2011 CBS pilot offers. Also, around the same time, there were reports that Disney was temporarily moving the series' sets from their lot.

 Episodes 

 Reception 

 Ratings 
The premiere was watched by 10.69 million viewers, the second episode dropped to 8.99 million viewers.

 Critical reception 
The series pilot episode received mostly positive reviews from critics. Review aggregator Metacritic gave the series a score of 65 out of 100, indicating generally favorable reviews based on 28 professional critics. Alessandra Stanley from The New York Times gave an average review, praising the fact that the show offers "calmer, more restrained fantasy about paranormal prowess" by combining shows like Heroes and Lost with the wholesome fantasy of Pixar's The Incredibles and Disney's The Swiss Family Robinson, but concluded her review by saying that "it's not clear whether this series—a hybrid of family drama and graphic novel—can sustain interest once the premise is fully established". Tim Goodman of the San Francisco Chronicle wrote a review saying that "There's lot of promise here, of drama, action, comedy, etc, all wrapped up in a family-friendly series." The Miami Herald Glenn Garvin gave a positive review by saying that the show is "a perceptive and engaging comedy drama about domestic dysfunction", he also praised Benz and Chiklis saying that they are "splendid as a startled couple", with Panabaker "as their sulky, contemptuous daughter".

Praise about the main leads also came from The Boston Globe, with critic Matthew Gilbert saying that it's nice to see Chiklis and Benz in roles different from their previous television roles, and ends his review by saying that "With believable chemistry together, Chiklis and Benz help create a solid TV couple and, let's hope, no ordinary series". However, Verne Gay from Newsday'' criticized Chiklis' performance saying that it is a "spectacular...case of miscasting".

Awards

International broadcasts 
The series premiered in the U.S. and Canada on September 28, 2010, and in Latin America on October 8, 2010 on SET. The show was one of the first US Fall 2010–2011 new series to premiere in South Africa and aired on M-Net Series from November 2010. It premiered in Italy on October 6, 2010, on Fox Italy, part of the Sky Italy Broadcast Group, and in the United Kingdom on January 11, 2011, on Watch, part of the UKTV group. In New Zealand the series premiered on February 3, 2011 on TV2. In Greece the series premiered March 3, 2011 on FX (Greece). The series premiered in Hong Kong on March 24, 2011 on TVB Pearl at 10:35 pm every Thursday. In Russia the series premiered Apr 4, 2011 on Fox Life. On May 2, 2011 the series premiered in Australia on the Seven Network at 7:30 pm, and in India on Zee Cafe at 10:00 pm. In Slovakia the series premiered June 27, 2011 at 8:15 pm on TV JOJ.

Home media
The show was released on DVD on September 9, 2011.

References

External links 

 

2010s American crime drama television series
2010s American comedy-drama television series
2010s American comic science fiction television series
2010 American television series debuts
2011 American television series endings
American Broadcasting Company original programming
English-language television shows
Fiction about superhuman features or abilities
Television series about families
Television series by ABC Studios
Television series created by Greg Berlanti
Television shows set in the United States